Peter Anthony Togni (born September 12, 1959) is a freelance Canadian composer and broadcaster based in Halifax, Nova Scotia. "Togni's music is deeply felt, simply put, well-crafted and irradiated by a personal sense of the divine."

Biography
Togni's music is spiritually rooted and contemplative.  It ranges from the ethereally quiet to the explosive outer limits of contemplation. Togni has been heard everywhere from Toronto's Roy Thompson Hall, the Moscow Conservatory, the Oriental Arts Centre in Shanghai, to the Vatican in Rome for Pope John Paul II. His music is broadcast regularly in Canada on the CBC, as well as internationally, including on the BBC, Classic FM, Deutsche Welle and Radio France.

Togni's works have been released on XXI Records, CBC Records, Hänssler Classics, Warner Classics UK.  In 2010 his Lamentatio Jeremiah Prophetae, a concerto for bass clarinet and choir, was recorded by bass clarinettist Jeff Reilly and the Elmer Iseler Singers and released on the ECM label, produced by Manfred Eicher. In October 2012 the Togni Trio's latest recording Spatium was released, and in 2013 Togni's latest solo CD, Piano Alone, came out.

In 2006, Togni's Illuminations (a concerto for bass clarinet and string orchestra) was nominated for a Juno award in the category Classical Composition of the Year. 2011 brought two nominations for Togni's Lamentations of Jeremiah, for an East Coast Music Award in the Classical Music category, and for a Juno award in the category Classical Composition of the Year. The work was also a finalist in 2010 for the Lieutenant Governor of Nova Scotia Masterworks Arts Award. In 2012, Togni's new work Missa Liberationis, the result of a project with the Latvian Youth Choir BALSIS was published by Musica Baltica, and was premiered in Canada by Pro Coro Canada. Also in 2012, Togni was the recipient of the Queen Elizabeth II's Diamond Jubilee Medal in honour of contributions made to Canadian community life.
The Responsio project for bass clarinettist Jeff Reilly and vocal quartet premiered in July 2013 and the recording was released in 2015 on ATMA Classique, to critical acclaim. The work is also the grand prize winner of the 2014 Lieutenant Governor of Nova Scotia Masterworks Arts Award. Warrior Songs, a work for percussionist Jerry Granelli and choir premiered in Bolder Colorado in 2014, with its Canadian premiere taking place in March 2015 with the Elmer Iseler Singers in Toronto. Work on Isis and Osiris, Gods of Egypt, an opera based on the libretto of Sharon Singer and in collaboration with Opera in Concert is underway, with a planned premiere for April 2016.

Togni is also a pianist, improviser and organist. He has given many solo recitals across Canada and in Europe. In July 2015, Togni took part in the 53rd Magadino International Organ Festival in Switzerland, which was co-founded by his late father, Victor Togni. He has also worked extensively in Canada as a church musician. He was music director at St. Mary's Cathedral in Calgary, an organist at St. Michael's Cathedral in Toronto and organist and choir master at St. Mary's Cathedral Basilica in Halifax. He was the organist in the world-renowned trio Sanctuary alongside bass clarinettist Jeff Reilly and cellist Christoph Both. Sanctuary, which was based in Halifax, Nova Scotia, Canada, was formed in 1999, and performed across Canada and around the world, at venues such as St. John's, Smith Square in London, Saint- Séverin in Paris and the Dome Cathedral in Riga, Latvia. In 2008 they were the first Canadians since Glenn Gould to play at Philharmonic Hall, in St. Petersburg Russia. They have also made several recordings including their acclaimed CD The heart has its reasons for Warner Classics UK, and their most recent CD Estuary, was released in 2015. The Togni Trio, a jazz ensemble with drummer Malcolm Gould and bassist George Koeller, performs throughout Canada and the United States, and has two released recordings. Togni also regularly collaborates with artists such as jazz saxophonist Mike Murley and cellist Jeffrey Ziegler.

Togni was born in Pembroke, Ontario in 1959, and is the son of organ master Victor Togni. He spent his early years in Toronto, where he attended St. Michael's Choir School. He later went on to study at the University of British Columbia in Vancouver, studying organ with Frederick Geoghegan and composition with Stephen Chatman. He went on to study organ and improvisation in Paris, France, with the great French organist Jean Langlais. Togni also studied composition with Allain Gaussin at the Schola Cantorum in Paris where he was awarded first prize in composition.

For over twenty years, Togni has also been a broadcaster, hosting radio programs for CBC Radio 2, including That Time of the Night, the award-winning Stereo Morning, Weekender and Choral Concert. He currently resides in Dartmouth, Nova Scotia.

Nominations and awards
 2006 - Illuminations - Juno nomination; Classical Composition of the Year
 2006 - The Heart Has Its Reasons; East Coast Music Award nomination; Classical Recording of the Year
 2010 - Lamentations of Jeremiah - Nova Scotia Masterworks Arts Award Finalist
 2011 - Lamentations of Jeremiah - East Coast Music Award nomination; Classical Recording of the Year
 2011 - Lamentations of Jeremiah - Juno nomination; Classical Composition of the Year
 2012 - Recipient of the Queen Elizabeth II's Diamond Jubilee Medal
 2014 - Responsio - Nova Scotia Masterworks Arts Award Grand Prize Winner
 2016 - Estuary; CD by the Sanctuary Trio - East Coast Music Award nomination; Classical Recording of the Year
 2016 - Responsio; CD - Juno nomination; Classical Album of the Year: Vocal or Choral Performance

Selected works

Choral
 When the Dawn Appears (1989) – Choir SSAA
 Create in me a clean heart (1990) – Choir SATB
 Ave Verum (1994) – Choir SATB
 Psalm 98 (1997) – Choir SATB, TTBB
 Antiphon (1999) – Choral version SATB
 Totus Tuus (2001) – Choir SATB
 Grandmother Moon (2001) – Double Choir SATB & soloists
 Missa Domus Mea (2001) – Choir SATB
 Sacer Dotes Domini (2001) – Choir SATB
 Prayer of St. Francis (pre-2002) – Choir SATB and Piano (Kellman Hall)
 Of the Fathers Love Begotten (2003) – Choir SATB
 Lamentations of Jeremiah (2007) – Choir SATB and Bass Clarinet
 Cantico delle Creature (2007) – Choir SATB and Organ
 Mass of St. Thomas Aquinas (2008) – Parish Mass, Congregational setting and Organ
 Requiem et Lux (2009) – Mixed choir
 Lux Aeterna (2010) – Gamelan & six voices
 Warrior Songs (2014) – Percussion and mixed choir
 Da Pacem Domine (2014) - From Warrior Songs
 Earth Voices" (2014) - Choir
 The Final Word is Love" (2015) - SATB a capella

Instrumental
 Tenebrae Litanies (1991) – String Orchestra
 Hymns of Heaven and Earth (String Quartet No.1) (2001) – String Quartet
 Caspian Blue (2004) – Piano and String Quartet
 Lamentations of Jeremiah (2007) – Choir SATB and Bass Clarinet
 O Magnum Mysterium (2007) – Solo Piano
 Solstice Nights (2008) – Oboe D'Amore and String Quartet
 Piano Verses (2008) – Solo Piano
 Personal Legend (String Quartet No.2) (2008) – String Quartet
 Seven Preludes (2010) – Organ

Albums

 Sea Dreams Luminous Voices; Leaf Music (2020)
 Estuary Sanctuary Trio; Independent (2016)
 Responsio; ATMA classique (2015)
 Piano Alone Peter-Anthony Togni; Independent (2013)
 Spatium The Togni Trio; Independent (2013)
 Lamentatio Jeremiae Prophet Elmer Iseler Singers, Jeff Reilly; ECM (2010)
 The heart has its reasons Sanctuary; Warner Classics UK (2005)
 Christus St. Mary's Basilica Gallery Choir (2004)
 Refuge Floating Senses; Hanssler Classics (2003)
 Puer natus in Bethlehem, Alleluia! Elmer Iseler Singers; CBC Records (2003)
 Sanctuary Sanctuary; XXIII Records (2001)
 Shimmeree Peter Togni Trio; Atma Records (1997)

References

External links
Peter A. Togni biography at the Canadian Music Center
la schola cantorum
Choral Concert on CBC Radio 2
Sanctuary
Elmer Iseler Singers
Allain Gaussin

1959 births
Living people
Canadian classical composers
Classical music radio presenters
CBC Radio hosts
Musicians from Halifax, Nova Scotia
Musicians from Ontario
People from Pembroke, Ontario
Sacred music composers
Schola Cantorum de Paris alumni
University of British Columbia alumni
Canadian male classical composers
20th-century classical composers
21st-century classical composers
20th-century Canadian composers
20th-century Canadian male musicians
21st-century Canadian male musicians